Golf at the 2019 Military World Games was held in Wuhan, China from 19 to 23 October 2019.

Medal summary

References 
 2019 Military World Games Results - Page 97 

Golf
Military World Games
2019
2019